Cotler is a surname. Notable people with the surname include:

 Irwin Cotler (born 1940), Member of the Canadian Parliament for Mount Royal
 Doug Cotler (born 1949), American singer-songwriting and composer
 Kami Cotler (born 1965), American actress and educator
 Julia Quinn, the pseudonym of Julie Pottinger (born Julie Cotler in 1970), an American writer
 Loire Cotler, American Jazz Rhythm Vocalist (born Lori Beth Cotler in 1972)
 Zachary Cotler (born 1981), American film director and poet

See also 
 Kotler
 Cottler